Human  is a 1976 Mexican drama film. It was directed by Gustavo Alatriste. The film was made in England in 1971, but it wasn't until July 1976 that it was released.

Cast
April Ashley 	
Mary Badeau 		
Jack Ross

References

External links
 

1976 films
1970s Spanish-language films
Films directed by Gustavo Alatriste
Mexican drama films
1976 drama films
Films shot in England
1970s Mexican films